Ryssby is a locality situated in Ljungby Municipality, Kronoberg County, Sweden with 707 inhabitants in 2010. It is situated at an altitude of 313 metres (1030 feet). Ryssby lies on the north end of the Ryssby Lake.

Ryssby Church has the greatest church in Ljungby Municipality, with up to 300 seats.

See also
Småland Runic Inscription 39

References 

Populated places in Kronoberg County
Populated places in Ljungby Municipality
Finnveden